Indochino is a made-to-measure menswear retailer that offers personalized suiting, casual wear, and outerwear. Originally founded as an exclusively online retailer, Indochino has opened 79 showrooms in Canada, the United States, and Australia. The company is headquartered in Vancouver, British Columbia, with a second office in Shanghai, China.

History 
Indochino was founded by Kyle Vucko and Heikal Gani. In late 2015, Vucko stepped down and Drew Green, the founder of Shop.ca, joined Indochino as chief executive officer.

Indochino was one of the first web-only retailers to open physical stores, initially through pop-up shops before opening permanent showrooms.  In showrooms, customers work with a  "style guide" who helps them design their garment, which is made to measure and shipped in around two weeks.

In 2016, Indochino raised funding from investors, opening about 80 showrooms in North America.

In 2017, Indochino entered into a strategic marketing partnership with Postmedia, a Canadian media company, receiving $40 million in advertising in exchange for an undisclosed share of its reveneue. In 2018, Indochino received a "strategic investment" from Mitsui & Co. under undisclosed terms.

In 2019, Indochino announced that it was expanding internationally and launching its online operations in Australia.

In 2021, the company partnered with Nordstrom to open 21 custom apparel stores-within-a-store at Nordstrom locations.

Currently, Indochino guides clients in the store location to find the styles, measure each person to order, and sends this information their manufacturer located overseas in China (and possibly other more "affordable" labor forces overseas). It takes approximately two weeks for the suit to be created/fashioned overseas and shipped to you. One could imagine the jobs that might be sustained if this portion was not outsourced.

References

Canadian companies established in 2007
Clothing companies established in 2007
Retail companies established in 2007
Internet properties established in 2007
Online clothing retailers of Canada
Clothing brands of Canada
Suit makers